Tomasz Grysa (born 16 October 1970) is a Polish prelate of the Catholic Church who works in the diplomatic service of the Holy See.

Biography
Tomasz Grysa was born on 16 October 1970 in Poznań, Poland. He was ordained a priest for the Archdiocese of Poznań on 25 May 1995 by Archbishop Jerzy Stroba.

He holds a degree in canon law.

He entered the Holy See Diplomatic Service on 1 July 2001 and subsequently served in the following pontifical representations: Russian Federation, India, Belgium, Mexico, Brazil, Un Permanent Mission (New York), Israel, and the apostolic delegation in Jerusalem and Palestine.

On 27 September 2022, Pope Francis appointed him Titular Archbishop of Rubicon and Apostolic Nuncio to Madagascar and Apostolic Delegate to Comoros.  He was consecrated as an archbishop on 1 November 2022.

On 9 February 2023, Pope Francis appointed him as nuncio to the Seychelles as well.

See also
 List of heads of the diplomatic missions of the Holy See

References

Living people
1970 births
Apostolic Nuncios to Madagascar
Diplomats of the Holy See
Pontifical Ecclesiastical Academy alumni